Bargers Springs is an unincorporated community in Summers County, West Virginia, United States.  It has also been called ″Greenbriar Springs″.  Bargers Springs is located on the Greenbrier River, southeast of Hinton.

History
Barger is the name of an early settler.

References

Unincorporated communities in Summers County, West Virginia
Unincorporated communities in West Virginia
Spa towns in West Virginia